"Looking for Clues" is a song by English musician Robert Palmer, which was released in 1980 as the second single from his sixth studio album Clues. It was written and produced by Palmer. "Looking for Clues" reached No. 33 in the UK, and No. 5 on the US Billboard Bubbling Under the Hot 100.

A music video was filmed to promote the single. It was one of the videos to be aired on MTV's first day of broadcasting, on 1 August 1981.

Critical reception
Upon release, Cash Box selected the single as one of their feature picks in November 1980. They commented: "Palmer's been around awhile, but musically, he continues to shift gears and develop as an artist. On [this] second single from his current LP, he has created an immensely infectious little electronic boogie, half pop, half funk, to support his high, multi-tracked vocals, with a neat vibe break."

In a review of Clues, Audio described the song as "futuristic sounding". In a retrospective review of the album, Donald A. Guarisco of AllMusic described the song as "a clever slice of new wave pop that surprises the listener with an unexpected xylophone solo". Ultimate Classic Rock included the song as one of Palmer's top 10 songs in a retrospective look at his career.

Track listings
7" single
"Looking for Clues" - 4:15
"What Do You Care" - 2:44

7" single (UK/Philippines/Netherlands release)
"Looking for Clues" - 4:15
"Good Care of You" - 2:24

7" single (UK alternative release)
"Looking for Clues" - 4:15
"In Walks Love Again" - 2:48

7" single (US/Canada release)
"Looking for Clues" - 4:08
"Woke Up Laughing" - 3:36

7" single (UK promo)
"Looking for Clues" - 4:08

7" single (US promo)
"Looking for Clues" - 4:08
"Looking for Clues" - 4:08

12" single (UK release)
"Looking for Clues (Long Version)" - 4:51
"Good Care of You" - 2:24
"Style Kills" - 4:16

12" single (European release)
"Looking for Clues" - 4:53
"Johnny and Mary" - 3:59

12" single (US promo)
"Looking for Clues" - 4:52
"Looking for Clues" - 4:52

Chart performance

Weekly Charts

Year-end charts

Personnel
 Robert Palmer - vocals, bass, percussion, producer
 Jack Waldman - keyboards
 Kenny Mazur - guitar
 Dony Wynn - drums
 Chris Frantz - bass drum
 Alex Sadkin - engineer, mixing
 David Harper - executive producer
 Ted Jensen - mastering

References

1980 songs
1980 singles
Island Records singles
Robert Palmer (singer) songs
Songs written by Robert Palmer (singer)
British new wave songs